This article contains the awards and records of Colorado's Arena Football League teams, the Denver Dynamite (1987, 1989–91) and Colorado Crush (2003–2008).  The records are arranged both in categories of individual franchise records and head-to-head for achievements in Colorado arenaball in general.

Hall of Fame
Tim Marcum, Head Coach (Denver Dynamite, 1987)
Gary Mullen, WR/DB (Denver Dynamite, 1987); AFL's 20 Greatest Players (#17)
John Elway approved for ownership, AFL's 20 Greatest Moments (#6)
Colorado Crush, 2005, AFL's 20 Greatest Teams (#15)
Colorado Crush vs Chicago Rush in American Conference Championship, June 5, 2005, AFL's 20 Greatest Games (#7)
Colorado Crush vs Georgia Force in ArenaBowl XIX, June 12, 2005, AFL's 20 Greatest Games (#14)
Denver Dynamite vs Chicago Bruisers, June 20, 1987, AFL's 20 Greatest Games (#20)

Awards

Colorado Crush

Franchise
 Commissioner's Award (2003)
John Elway - Executive of the Year (2003)

Players
Anthony Dunn, FB/LB - All-Rookie Team (2006)
John Dutton, QB - Al Lucas Hero Award (2007), Al Lucas Hero Team (2007)
Rashad Floyd, DS, DB - 2nd Team All-Arena Team (2004, 2006, 2007)
Damian Harrell, OS, WR - Offensive Player of the Year (2005, 2006), 1st Team All-Arena Team (2005, 2006), 2nd Team All-Arena Team (2004, 2007)
Hugh Hunter, OL/DL - All-Ironman Team (2006)
Willis Marshall, WR/DB - All-Ironman Team (2005, 2006)
Kevin McKenzie, WR/LB - All-Ironman Team (2004)
Kyle Moore-Brown, OL/DL, C - All-Ironman Team (2005, 2006), 1st Team All-Arena Team (2007)
Clay Rush, K - 2nd Team All-Arena Team (2005, 2006)
Chris Snyder, OL/DL - All-Ironman Team (2007)
Robert Thomas, FB/LB - All-Ironman Team (2007)
Rich Young, FB/LB - All-Ironman Team (2005), 2nd Team All-Arena Team (2005)

Denver Dynamite

Coaches
Tim Marcum - Coach of the Year (1987)
Babe Parilli - Coach of the Year (1989)

Players
Chris Brewer, FB/LB - 1st Team All-Arena Team (1987)
Patrick Cain, OL/DL - 2nd Team All-Arena Team (1987)
Wayne Coffey, WR/DB - 1st Team All-Arena Team (1991)
Rusty Fricke, K - Kicker of the Year (1991), 1st Team All-Arena Team (1991)
Gary Gussman, K - 1st Team All-Arena Team (1989)
Kelly Kirchbaum, OL/DL - 2nd Team All-Arena Team (1987)
Quinton Knight, OL/DL - 1st Team All-Arena Team (1989, 1990)
Joe March, OL/DL - 1st Team All-Arena Team (1991)
Gary Mullen, WR/DB - 1st Team All-Arena Team (1987)
Durell Taylor, FB/LB - 2nd Team All-Arena Team (1987)
Whit Taylor, QB - 2nd Team All-Arena Team (1987)
Alvin Williams, DS - 2nd Team All-Arena Team (1991)
Mitch Young, OL/DL - 2nd Team All-Arena Team (1990)

Records

Colorado Crush

Most Points, Game - 77 (April 10, 2005 vs Philadelphia Soul and April 1, 2006 vs Nashville Kats)
Fewest Points, Game - 14 (June 4, 2007 at Utah Blaze)
Highest Attendance, Game - 18,093 (June 25, 2007 vs Dallas Desperadoes)
Lowest Attendance, Game - 3,933 (April 10, 2005 vs Philadelphia Soul)
Wins, Season - 13 (2005)
Losses, Season - 14 (2003)

Denver Dynamite

Most Points, Game - 73 (July 3, 1987 vs Washington Commandos)
Fewest Points, Game - 13 (May 31, 1991 vs Detroit Drive and August 9, 1991 at Tampa Bay Storm)
Highest Attendance, Game - 13,470 (July 24, 1987 vs Chicago Bruisers)
Lowest Attendance, Game - 4,365 (June 7, 1991 vs Albany Firebirds)
Wins, Season - 6 (1991)
Losses, Season - 5 (1990, 1991)

Colorado Arena Football

Most Points, Game - 77 (Colorado Crush, April 10, 2005 vs Philadelphia Soul and April 1, 2006 vs Nashville Kats)
Fewest Points, Game - 13 (Denver Dynamite, May 31, 1991 vs Detroit Drive and August 9, 1991 at Tampa Bay Storm)
Highest Attendance, Game - 18,093 (Colorado Crush, June 25, 2007 vs Dallas Desperadoes)
Lowest Attendance, Game - 3,933 (Colorado Crush, April 10, 2005 vs Philadelphia Soul)
Wins, Season - 13 (Colorado Crush, 2005)
Losses, Season - 14 (Colorado Crush, 2003)

Arena Football League in Denver